The Sweden men's national field hockey team represents Sweden in international field hockey competitions.

Tournament record

EuroHockey Championship II
2011 – 7th place

EuroHockey Championship III
2005 – 6th place
2007 – 6th place
2009 – 
2013 – 6th place
2015 – 6th place

EuroHockey Championship IV
2021 – Withdrew

Hockey World League
2012–13 – Round 1

See also
Sweden women's national field hockey team

References

External links
Official website
FIH profile

European men's national field hockey teams
Field hockey
National team
Men's sport in Sweden